Hans Saksvik (25 July 1926 – 12 October 2001) was a Norwegian footballer. He played in one match for the Norway national football team in 1959.

References

External links
 

1926 births
2001 deaths
Norwegian footballers
Norway international footballers
Place of birth missing
Association footballers not categorized by position